Fang Fang, pen name of Wang Fang (born 11 May 1955), is a Chinese writer, known for her literary depictions of the working poor. She won the Lu Xun Literary Prize in 2010. Born in Nanjing, she attended Wuhan University in 1978 to study Chinese. In 1975, she began to write poetry and in 1982, her first novel was published. She has since written several novels, some of which have been honored by Chinese national-level literary prizes. Fang garnered international attention for her Wuhan Diary, documenting the early stages of the COVID-19 pandemic in China, and has used her platform to call for an end to internet censorship in China.

Wuhan Diary

During the 2020 Hubei lockdowns, Fang Fang used social media to share her Wuhan Diary, a daily account of life in the locked-down city of Wuhan. In addition to her own writing, Wuhan Diary utilized anonymous interviews with other people in the city. The account drew international public attention. In the west, Fang Fang was met with almost unanimously positive reaction. Fang Fang’s publishing house, HarperCollins mentions that her work is a display of courage to expose social injustice, corruption and sociopolitical problems that hindered the response to the pandemic.

Criticism 
Fang Fang—a member of China Writers Association and the former chairwoman of the officially affiliated Hubei Writers’ Association—was considered to be a "politically trustworthy figure". However, her daily diary entries that were posted on Weibo, during the 2020 Hubei lockdowns, were met with harsh criticism and ridicule by Chinese netizens. One of Fang Fang's critics is Zhang Boli—a Tradtional Chinese Medicine physician— who spent 82 days working in Wuhan's front lines. Zhang criticized those who had expressed "distorted values," including Fang Fang, in an online speech he gave on May 12, 2020, about the national struggle to fight the virus. Fang Fang then contacted Zhang on Weibo for an apology, which prompted a heated debate on the social media platform. Netizens argued that Fang Fang, who resided in her villa and posting her diary online, did not have as much credibility compared to Zhang, who was a doctor in the front lines.

In Wuhan Diary (2020), and also other sources, Fang Fang continuously insists that her diary is not in any way aimed against the Chinese government. In an interview for Caixin, she makes a point that "there’s no tension between me and the country, and my book will only help the country" and that her "diary is by no means about the so-called negative things in China or deliberately peddling misery as misinterpreted by extremists. They take it out of context"

Within China, Fang Fang has faced criticism, being labelled as a liar and "traitor" by users on social media platforms such as Weibo due to her perceived criticism of the Chinese government. She has continued writing, however, despite the fact that some of her works have been blocked from publication.

Awards
Fang Fang was on the list of the BBC's 100 Women announced on 23 November 2020.

Translated works (English)
Wuhan Diary: Dispatches from a Quarantined City, translated by Michael Berry, HarperCollins, 2020.
The Walls of Wuchang, translated by Olivia Milburn, Sinoist Books, 2022.

See also
Li Wenliang
Chen Qiushi
Fang Bin
 Wuhan Huanan Seafood Wholesale Market

References 

1955 births
BBC 100 Women
Writers from Nanjing
Living people
Wuhan University alumni
Chinese women short story writers
Chinese short story writers
People's Republic of China short story writers
Short story writers from Jiangsu
Chinese bloggers
Chinese women bloggers
Chinese diarists
Women diarists